Eremophila barbata is a flowering plant in the figwort family, Scrophulariaceae and is endemic to a small area in the Eyre Peninsula of South Australia. It is a very rare, small, spreading shrub  distinguished by a prominent "beard" on the lower lobe of its lilac-coloured flowers.

Description

The flowers are usually borne singly in leaf axils and lack a stalk. The tube and the petal lobes on its end are lilac-coloured, lack spots and are glabrous on the outside. The lower, middle petal lobe and the inside of the petal tube is covered with long, soft hairs.

Taxonomy and naming
Eremophila barbata was first formally described by Robert Chinnock in 1985 with the description published in The Journal of the Adelaide Botanic Garden. The type specimen was collected by Chinnock in 1979 in the Hincks National Park. The specific epithet (barbata) is a Latin word meaning "bearded."

Distribution and habitat
This eremophila is only known from two small areas on the Eyre Peninsula - Hincks Wilderness Protection Area and near Ungarra where it grows in rocky clay as an understorey in mallee.

Conservation status
Eremophila barbata is classified as "endangered" in the Environment Protection and Biodiversity Conservation Act 1999 and was listed as "rare" in the 1997 IUCN Red List of Threatened Plants.

Use in horticulture
The long, arching branches of this species make it suitable for growing in a rockery or hanging over a wall. It is long-lived in the garden and some specimens have grown for more than 30 years. It can be propagated from cuttings and grown in a wide variety of soils and aspects although it be damaged by frost when young.

References

Flora of South Australia
barbata
Plants described in 1985